Zou Jingyuan (born 3 January 1998) is a Chinese artistic gymnast who specializes on parallel bars and rings. He is the 2020 Olympic Champion and a three-time world champion on parallel bars in 2017, 2018, and 2022. He was a member of the Chinese team that won bronze at the 2020 Tokyo Olympics, gold at the 2018 and 2022 World Championships, and bronze at the 2019 World Championships. He was the silver medalist on rings at the 2022 World Championships.

Personal life 
Zou Jingyuan was born 3 January 1998 in Yibin, Sichuan, China. He started gymnastics at the age of three when he was scouted by a coach because of his good physical condition.

The General Administration of Sport of China named Zou an Elite Athlete of National Class in 2016.

Zou studies physical education at Chengdu Sport University.

Career

2017 
In May 2017, Zou competed at the Asian Championships in Bangkok, Thailand, where his team won gold. He won first on parallel bars and rings, as well as second on pommel horse.

In October, Zou competed at the World Championships in Montreal, Canada, where he placed first on parallel bars.

2018 
In August, Zou competed at the Asian Games in Indonesia, where his team won first. Zou placed first on parallel bars and second on pommel horse.

In October, Zou competed at the World Championships in Doha, Qatar, where the team placed first. Zou placed first on parallel bars.

2019 
Zou competed at the World Championships in Stuttgart, Germany, where his team placed second. He failed to qualify for the parallel bars event final after an error in qualifying, but his team final parallel bars score of 16.383 was the highest score of the competition.

2021 
At the 2020 Summer Olympics in Tokyo, Japan, Zou competed for the People's Republic of China, a team including Sun Wei, Zou Jingyuan, Xiao Ruoteng, and Lin Chaopan. The team won Olympic bronze with a combined score of 262.397, 0.606 points beneath the winning team. Zou won Olympic gold on parallel bars with a score of 16.233, the highest score and widest margin of victory (0.533) posted by any gymnast in any event at the Tokyo Olympics.

2022
Zou competed on parallel bars and rings for China at the World Championships in Liverpool, winning gold in the team event, gold on parallel bars, and silver on rings behind gold medalist Adem Asil. His score in the parallel bars final of 16.166 was the highest score posted by a gymnast at the competition. He added a new named element on rings during qualifications, the Zou: the gymnast lowers slowly from inverted cross to inverted hang and felges backward slowly to V cross, holding for 2 seconds. The Zou has an E value.

References

External links 
 

1998 births
Living people
Chinese male artistic gymnasts
Medalists at the World Artistic Gymnastics Championships
Gymnasts at the 2018 Asian Games
Medalists at the 2018 Asian Games
Asian Games gold medalists for China
Asian Games silver medalists for China
Asian Games medalists in gymnastics
People from Yibin
Gymnasts from Sichuan
Gymnasts at the 2020 Summer Olympics
Olympic gymnasts of China
Olympic gold medalists for China
Olympic bronze medalists for China
Medalists at the 2020 Summer Olympics
Olympic medalists in gymnastics
World champion gymnasts
21st-century Chinese people